CBM-FM (93.5 MHz) is a public non-commercial radio station in Montreal, Quebec. It carries the English-language CBC Music network.

Owned and operated by the government-owned Canadian Broadcasting Corporation, CBM-FM is a Class C1 station. It transmits from the Mount Royal candelabra tower with an effective radiated power of 100,000 watts, using horizontal polarization. Its studios and offices, along with those of CBC Radio One sister station CBME-FM, are located at Maison Radio-Canada on René Lévesque Boulevard.

History
In 1947, CBM-FM first signed on at 100.7 MHz. In its early years, it simulcast the programming of co-owned CBM. French language CBF-FM also officially went on the air that year, at 95.1 MHz, although it had done experimental broadcasts for several years leading up to its sign-on.

In 1960, CBM-FM began airing separate programming, along with the other CBC FM stations, playing mostly classical music. It became a simulcast of CBM again in 1962, but returned to separate programming in 1964.

In 1971, CBM-FM moved to 93.5. CBF-FM took over the 100.7 frequency vacated by CBM-FM.

The CBC FM network was rebranded CBC Stereo on 3 November 1975, and CBC Radio Two in 1997. In 2006, CBM-FM and other Radio Two stations began a transition from mostly classical and jazz programming to a mix of adult album alternative, singer-songwriter and world music, as well as some classical and jazz.

The weeknight version of the jazz program Tonic, hosted by Katie Malloch, originated from CBM-FM until Malloch's retirement in 2012.

Rebroadcasters

References

External links
 
 

BM
BM
BM
Radio stations established in 1946
1946 establishments in Quebec